Vodenicharov or Vodenitcharov (Воденичаров) is a Bulgarian-language surname. Notable people with the surname include:

Dimitar Vodenicharov (born 1987), Bulgarian footballer
Kamen Vodenicharov (born 1966), Bulgarian actor
Boyan Vodenitcharov (born 1960), Bulgarian pianist and composer

Bulgarian-language surnames